Romans 12 is the twelfth chapter of the Epistle to the Romans in the New Testament of the Christian Bible. It is authored by Paul the Apostle, while he was in Corinth in the mid-50s AD, with the help of an amanuensis (secretary), Tertius, who adds his own greeting in Romans 16:22.

Text

The original text was written in Koine Greek. This chapter is divided into 21 verses.

Textual witnesses
Some early manuscripts containing the text of this chapter are:
In Greek:
 Codex Vaticanus (AD 325–350)
 Codex Sinaiticus (330–360)
 Codex Alexandrinus (400–440)
In Gothic language
 Codex Carolinus (6th/7th century; extant verses 1–5, 17–21)
In Latin
 Codex Carolinus (6th/7th century; extant verses 1–5, 17–21)

Old Testament references
 Romans 12:19 references Deuteronomy 32:35
 Romans 12:20 references Proverbs 25:21,22

A living sacrifice and the renewal of minds (12:1–2)

Verse 1

The first letter of Peter uses a similar expressions:

Lutheran theologian Johann Albrecht Bengel summarises the contrasts to which Paul refers:

Verse 2

"Be conformed": translated from  'to become like-shaped'; same word as 1 Peter 1:14 The verb is based on the Greek noun , indicating a 'form' that is external rather than internal, which occurs in 1 Corinthians 7:31 ("the fashion of this world") and Philippians 2:8 ("in fashion as a man").
"To this world": The 'world' here is in the sense of 'age' Same phrase as in Matthew 12:32; Luke 16:8; 1 Corinthians 1:20; 1 Corinthians 2:6; 1 Corinthians 2:8; 1 Corinthians 3:18; 2 Corinthians 4:3; Galatians 1:4; Ephesians 1:21; 1 Timothy 6:17; 2 Timothy 4:10; Titus 2:12.

Exhortations for the Christian community (12:3–8)
Verses 3–8 is in a form of sermon, closely paralleled by 1 Corinthians 12:12–28. Paul starts the exhortation first to the humility and Christian unity, reflecting that he writes from Corinth, "the native habitat of spiritual pride and factional division" (cf. 1 Corinthians 1–4). A major difference with the epistle to the Corinthians is that the list of gifts in verses 6–8 includes gifts of exhortation, generosity, and compassion but not deeds of power, healings, and tongues as found in 1 Corinthians 12:28. In Romans the gifts are not related specifically to the activity of the Holy Spirit.

Verse 3

"Through the grace given to me": translated from Greek ; 'by means of (in virtue of) the divine grace bestowed on me'; which characterizes Paul's apostleship (1 Corinthians 15:10; cf. Romans 15:15; 1 Corinthians 3:10; Ephesians 3:7–8).

Verse 4

Each one of us has a body with many parts, and these parts all have different uses.

Verse 5
so we, being many, are one body in Christ, and individually members of one another.
"In Christ": that is, "by virtue of the union with Christ" (cf.).

Verse 6
We have different gifts, according to the grace God has given us. If the gift is prophecy, do it in complete agreement with the faith.

Love in action (12:9–21)
Some verses echo the Old Testament, notably 16c, 19c, and 20, while others are reflections of Jesus' teachings (especially 14, 17, 18 and 21).

William Barclay suggests that in verses 9 to 13, "Paul presents his people with [twelve] telegraphic rules for everyday life".

Verses 17–21
Verses 17–21 form a chiasm, bracketed by lines containing the word "evil" – verse 17a and verse 21. The next layer comprising verses 17b–18 and verse 20, deals with the way to treat non-Christians. The central portion is the prohibition of vengeance.

Vengeance is mine (12:19)

Part of this verse – "I will repay" or in older translations "vengeance is mine" ("Vengeance is mine, and recompense" ESV) – is a quotation from Deuteronomy 32:35. Paul's instruction here is not to be vengeful. John Wycliffe and his colleagues translated as "not defending yourselves" (Romans 12:19).

Verse 21

This verse is a comprehensive summary of Romans 12:19–20, that is, "be not carried away to revenge and retaliation (verse 19) by evil which is committed against you, but overcome the evil by the good which you show to your enemy (verse 20), put to shame by your noble spirit, ceases to act malignantly against you and becomes your friend".

See also
 Spiritual gift
 Related Bible parts: Deuteronomy 32, 1 Corinthians 12

References

Bibliography

External links
 King James Bible - Wikisource
English Translation with Parallel Latin Vulgate
Online Bible at GospelHall.org (ESV, KJV, Darby, American Standard Version, Bible in Basic English)
Multiple bible versions at Bible Gateway (NKJV, NIV, NRSV etc.)

12